Manipay Ladies' College ( Māṉippāy Makaḷir Kallūri, also known as Manipay Ladies' Hindu College) is a provincial school in Manipay, Sri Lanka.

See also
 List of schools in Northern Province, Sri Lanka

References

External links
 Old Students' Association, Canada

Provincial schools in Sri Lanka
Schools in Manipay